Janet Heenan (born July 29, 1969) is a former New Zealand rugby union player. She played for the Black Ferns and Northland. She made her debut for New Zealand on 31 August 1996 against Australia at Sydney. She was selected for the 1998 Women's Rugby World Cup squad.

References

External links 

 Black Ferns Profile

1969 births
Living people
New Zealand women's international rugby union players
New Zealand female rugby union players